The Élan was a popular snowmobile variant of Ski-Doo built by Bombardier from 1971 to 1996.  They were offered a rather large variety of options including 1 or 2-cylinder engines, different designs on the hood, and other choices. In 1971 the Elans originally came with Rotax engines 250cc (247cc) single-cylinder rated at 12 hp which had the options of having an electric start as well as a recoil starter.  In 1973, they introduced 2 new engines, a 250cc (247cc) twin-cylinder rated at 16 hp had a standard muffler and a single HR carb, and the SS model that was a 250 (247cc) twin-cylinder rated at 22 hp with dual HR carbs, tuned exhaust, disc brake, and new standard chrome bumper.

Because of its basic, cheap design, the Élan was long popular with hunters, trappers, and those living in the far north, where certain repair parts (such as a CDI) for other newer sleds could fail, would be harder to obtain, and could leave their riders stranded.

Engine specifications
 250 single - Rotax 247. 246,8 cc. 69x66 mm. 12 hp
 292 SS - Rotax single cylinder 292 cc. 
 250 E (same as 250, but with electric start)
 250 SS - 247,3 cc 54x54 mm. twin cylinder with dual HR carbs 22 hp
 250 Twin - 247,3 cc. 54x54 mm. Two cylinders.16 hp.
 250 Deluxe - 247,3 cc. 54x54 mm. Two cylinders and electric start 16  hp.
 300 SS - 293,3 cc. 57x57,5 mm. Two cylinders. In 1974 increased engine size from 250 to 294 cc and 26 hp

References

Snowmobile brands
Bombardier Recreational Products